"I Believe" is a song by American rock band Bon Jovi. Written by Jon Bon Jovi, it was released in September 20, 1993, as the fifth single from their fifth studio album, Keep the Faith (1992). The single reached number 11 in the United Kingdom and number 40 in Australia.

Live performances
"I Believe" was played extensively during the Keep the Faith Tour (1993) and the I'll Sleep When I'm Dead Tour (1993) and on occasion on the Crush Tour (2000). Since then, it has been barely played and has become one of the rarest songs to be played live. It was played once in Germany during the 2003 Bounce Tour, once in London during the 2008 Lost Highway Tour, and most recently, once in Sydney, Australia during the 2010 Circle Tour. When played live, this song features both Richie Sambora and Jon Bon Jovi at guitar.

Track listing
UK release
 "I Believe" (Clearmountain Mix)
 "Runaway" (live)
 "Livin' on a Prayer" (live)
 "Wanted Dead or Alive" (live)

Tracks 2, 3, and 4 were recorded live on the New Jersey and Keep the Faith Tours. The dates or locations of the shows are not available due to their absence from the liner notes.

Charts

References
 

 

Bon Jovi songs
1992 songs
1993 singles
Mercury Records singles
Song recordings produced by Bob Rock
Songs written by Jon Bon Jovi